Cape Town Film Studios is a film and television studio in Cape Town, South Africa. It opened in May 2010.

The 200-hectare studio, located about 30 kilometres from the centre of Cape Town, has been involved in the production of a number of blockbusters, including Chronicle (2012), Dredd (2012), Mad Max: Fury Road (2015), Maze Runner: The Death Cure (2018), Tomb Raider (2018), Bloodshot (2020) and Monster Hunter (2020). It was also involved in the production of several television shows, including Black Sails (2014–2017) and Good Omens (2019).

Productions 
The studio has been involved in a number of movies and television shows including:

Films 
 Chronicle (2012)
 Safe House (2012)
 Dredd (2012)
 Mad Max: Fury Road (2015)
 Maze Runner: The Death Cure (2018)
 Tomb Raider (2018)
 The Red Sea Diving Resort (2019)
 Inside Man: Most Wanted (2019)
 Bloodshot (2020)
 Monster Hunter (2020)

Television 
 The Great British Story: A People's History (2012)
 Labyrinth (2012)
 Black Sails (2014–2017)
 Saints & Strangers (2015)
 Blood Drive (2017)
 Doctor Who (series 11) (2018)
 Good Omens (2019)
 Warrior (2019–2020)
 Resident Evil (2021)
 One Piece (TBA)

See also 

List of film production companies
List of television production companies

References

External links 
 

South African companies established in 2010
Mass media companies established in 2010
Film production companies of South Africa